Warren Huart is an English record producer, musician, composer and recording engineer based in Los Angeles, California who is most associated as a music producer and/or engineer in the recording industry as a multi-platinum producer for The Fray, Daniel Powter, Marc Broussard, Trevor Hall, Korn, Better Than Ezra, James Blunt, Matisyahu, Ace Frehley, Aerosmith and Howie Day. His film and television credits include Inglourious Basterds, Transformers: Revenge of the Fallen, MTV’s The Hills, Lost, Scrubs, and Grey’s Anatomy. Huart is the owner of Spitfire Studio in Los Angeles, California, and runs a DIY YouTube Channel called "Produce Like a Pro" with over 600,000 subscribers worldwide. Huart is also an audio educator, and he won the 2019 NAMM TEC Awards for Audio Education Technology for his Produce Like a Pro website.

Biography 

Warren Huart was born in Crookham Village, Hampshire, England on 28 January 1969. While in England he joined the band Star 69. The band relocated to the United States in 1996 to record Eating February with record producer Don Smith  (music producer). The album was released on Radioactive Records/MCA Records in 1997. After the breakup of Star 69, Huart formed Disappointment Incorporated (Dis. Inc.),which released an EP, Spoken Through Profits, and an album, F=0, on Time Bomb Recordings/Arista in 1998 and 1999 respectively.

Production and engineering 
Huart has produced and/or engineered the following artists among others:
Augustana
Ace Frehley
Aerosmith
The Fray
Kris Allen
Ramones
James Blunt
The X Factor (U.S.)
Daniel Powter
Jamie Hartman of Ben's Brother
Hot Hot Heat
The Thrills
Vedera
Korn
Mimi Page
Josiah Leming
Black Veil Brides
Better Than Ezra
Howie Day
The Dance Party
Brendan James
Matisyahu
Mandi Perkins
Secondhand Serenade
Mikey Wax
Chase Coy
Colbie Caillat
Eve 6
Future Leaders of the World
The Tender Box
Jay Clifford from Jump Little Children
Johnette Napolitano from Concrete Blonde
The Fontaine Brothers
Robert Jon & the Wreck

Charts and awards 
Recorded The Fray's self-titled second album which debuted at Number One on the Billboard charts.
Recorded Augustana's second album Can't Love, Can't Hurt.
Warren recorded Howie Day's 2005/2006 hit single "She Says", which reached number 6 on the Adult Top 40 chart and the number 1 on Top 40 Adult Recurrents.
Recorded and Mixed The Fray's cover of "Happy Xmas (War is Over)", which was the first song to chart on the Billboard Hot 100 with digital sales only.
Recorded drums for The Fray's hit "How To Save A Life," which reached number 3 on the Billboard Hot 100, spent 15 weeks at number 1 on the Adult Top 40, and was nominated for the 49th Grammy Awards for Best Rock Performance by a Duo or Group with Vocal.

Produce Like a Pro 
In 2014, Huart started a YouTube channel titled "Produce Like a Pro," with professional audio recording tips for beginners. His instructional videos encompass every aspect of recording, engineering, producing and technical properties involved in running a home-based studio. Huart has a base of over 600,000 subscribers and over 60 million views.

Personal life
Huart currently lives in the Los Angeles area with his wife and their two children.

References

External links
[ AllMusic Warren Huart]
Grammy Nomination The Fray
Produce Like a Pro, Warren Huart's production classes website
Warren Huart's website

The Fray  go number one
The Fray Topples Springsteen on Billboard
Inside Track: Recording Aerosmith (Warren Huart)
Producer Warren Huart on Working with Ace Frehley, Aerosmith, Slash, John 5 and Lita Ford
Interview with Warren Huart on transition from analog recording to digital recording

1969 births
English audio engineers
English record producers
Living people